Kano State House of Assembly is the state legislature of Kano State, Nigeria.
The Kano State House of Assembly is one of the arms of Kano State Government which comprises the Executives, Judiciary and the legislatives, House of Assembly are the legislatives of Kano State. The Chamber and the offices of the Members are located at Abdu Bako Secretariat  in the state capital, Kano Municipal. The House of Assembly is currently under the Leadership of All Progressives Congress (APC). There have been nine different house of assemblies the very first one was inaugurated 2 October 1979 and the present one was inaugurated 7 June 2019. There are forty members of the State House of Assembly, that represent forty-four local government areas in Kano State.

Leadership
The maximum number of the principal officers of Kano State House of Assembly is eight which include  the 
 Speaker Right Honourable Hamisu Chidari Member representing Makoda Constituency, 
 Deputy Speaker Honourable Zubairu Hamza Masu Member representing Sumaila Constituency, 
 Majority Leader Honourable Labaran Abdul Madari Member representing Warawa Constituency, 
 Deputy Majority Leader Abdullahi Iliyasu Yaryasa Member representing Tudun Wada Constituency, 
 Chief Whip Labaran Ayuba Member representing Kabo Constituency, 
 Deputy Whip Hayatu Musa Dorawar Sallau Member representing Kura/Garun Mallam Constituency, 
All are from All Progressive Congress (APC) and the last two are representing of the minority members of Kano State House of Assembly are: 
 Minority Leader Honourable Iliyasu Ali Danja Member representing Gezawa Constituency,
Deputy Minority LeaderHonourable Garba Shehu Fammar Member representing Kibiya Constituency 
All are from Peoples Democratic Party (PDP)

9th Kano State House of Assembly members 2019-2023
 Rt. Hon Hamisu Chidari  Speaker (APC) (Makoda Constituency)
 Hon. Labaran Abdul Madari Majority Leader (APC) (Warawa Constituency)
 Hon. Ayuba Labaran Alhassan Chief Whip (APC) (Kabo Constituency)
 Hon. Kabiru Hassan Dashi  (APC) Deputy Majority Leader (Kiru Constituency)
 Hon. Hayatu Musa Dorawar Sallau Deputy Whip (APC) (Kura/Garun Malam Constituency)
 Hon. Isyaku Ali Danja Minority Leader (PDP) (Gezawa Constituency)
 Hon. Garba Shehu Fammar Deputy Minority Leader (PDP) (Kibiya Constituency)
 Hon. Muhammad Ballo Butu-Butu (APC) (Rimin Gado/Tofa Constituency)
 Hon. Nuraddeen Alhassan Ahmad (APC) (Rano Constituency)
 Hon. Jibril Isma'il Falgore (APC) (Rogo Constituency)
 Hon. Tukur Muhammad (PDP) (Fagge Constituency)
 Hon. Salisu Maje Ahmad Gwangwazo (PDP) (Municipal Constituency)
 Hon. Lawal Rabi'u (PDP) (Tarauni Constituency)
 Hon. Umar Musa Gama (PDP) (Nassarawa Constituency)
 Hon. Aminu Saadu (PDP) (Ungoggo Constituency)
 Hon. Lawal Hussain (PDP) (Dala Constituency)
 Hon. Abdul’aziz Garba Gafasa (APC) (Ajingi Constituency)
 Hon. Yusuf Babangida Suleiman (PDP) (Gwale Constituency)
 Hon. Mudassir Ibrahim (PDP) (Kumbotso Constituency)
 Hon. Muhammad Elyakub (APC) (Dawaki Kudu Constituency)
 Hon. Kabiru Yusuf Isma'il (APC) (Madobi Constituency)
 Hon. Tasi’u Ibrahim Zabainawa (APC) (Minjibir Constituency)
 Hon. Muhammad Dan’azumi (APC) (Gabawa Constituency)
 Hon. Saleh Ahmed Marke (APC) (Dawaki Tofa Constituency)
 Hon. Nuhu Abdullahi Achika (APC) (Wudil Constituency)
 Hon. Nasiru Abdullahi Dutsen Amare (APC) (Karaye Constituency)
 Hon. Abubakar Danladi Isah (APC) (Gaya Constituency)
 Hon. Abba Ibrahim Garko (APC) (Garko Constituency)
 Hon. Zubairu Hamza Masu (APC) (Sumaila Constituency)
 Hon. Musa Ali Kachako (APC) (Takai Constituency)
 Hon. Sunusi Usman Bataiya (APC) (Albasu Constituency)
 Hon. Garba Ya’u Gwarmai (APC) (Kunchi/Tsanyawa Constituency)
 Hon. Abdullahi Iliyasu Yaryasa (APC) (Tudun Wada Constituency)
 Hon. Lawal Shehu (APC) (Bichi Constituency)
 Hon. Abubakar U. Galadima (APC) (Bebeji Constituency)
 Hon. Ali Ibrahim Isah Shanono (APC) (Bagwai/Shanono Constituency)
 Hon. Muhammad Uba Gurjiya (APC) (Bunkure Constituency)
 Hon. Salisu Ibrahim Muhammad (APC) (Doguwa Constituency)
 Hon. Murtala Musa Kore (APC) (Dambatta Constituency)
 Hon. Yunusa Haruna Kayyu (APC) (Gwarzo Constituency)

8th Kano State House of Assembly members 2015-2019
 Rt. Hon. Kabiru Alhassan Rurum (APC) Speaker (Rano Constituency)
 Hon. Hamisu Chidari Deputy Speaker (APC) (Makoda Constituency)
 Hon. Baffa Babba Danagundi (APC) Majority Leader (Municipal Constituency)
 Hon. Kabiru Hassan Dashi (APC) Deputy Majority Leader (Kiru Constituency)
 Hon. Labaran Abdul Madari Chief Whip (APC) (Warawa Constituency)
 Hon. Ayuba Labaran Alhassan Majority Whip (APC) (Kabo Constituency)
 Hon. Abdullahi Muhammad (PDP) Minority Leader (Kura/Garum Malam Constituency)
 Hon. Yusuf Abdullahi Ata (APC) (Fagge Constituency) 
 Hon. Isyaku Ali Danja (PDP) (Gezawa Constituency)
 Hon. Yusuf Abdullahi Falgore (PDP) (Rogo Constituency)
 Hon. Abdul'aziz Garba Gafasa (APC) (Ajingi Constituency)
 Hon. Abubakar Zakari Muhahammad (APC) (Tarauni Constituency)
 Hon. Ibrahim Ahmad Gama (APC) (Nassarawa Constituency)
 Hon. Tasi'u Rabi'u Panshekara (APC) (Ungoggo Constituency)
 Hon. Babangida Alhassan Yusuf (APC) (Dala Constituency)
 Hon. Yusuf Babangida Suleiman (APC) (Gwale Constituency)
 Hon. Naziru Zakari Sheka (APC) (Kumbotso Constituency)
 Hon. Ibrahim M. Dawakiji (APC) (Dawaki Kudu Constituency)
 Hon. Zubair Mahmuda (PDP) (Madobi Constituency)
 Hon. Tasi'u Ibrahim Zabainawa (APC) (Minjibir Constituency)
 Hon. Muhammad Dan'azumi (APC) (Gabasawa Constituency)
 Hon. Saleh Ahmed Marke (APC) (Dawaki Tofa Constituency)
 Hon. Muhammad Ballo Butu-Butu (APC) (Rimin Gado/Tofa Constituency)
 Hon. Nasiru Abdullahi Dutsen Amare (APC) (Karaye Constituency)
 Hon. Suyudi Mahmuda Kademi (APC) (Gaya Constituency)
 Hon. Abba Ibrahim Garko (APC) (Garko Constituency)
 Hon. Zubairu Hamza Masu (APC) (Sumaila Constituency)
 Hon. Musa Ali Kachako (APC) (Takai Constituency)
 Hon. Sunusi Usman Bataiya (APC) (Albasu Constituency)
 Hon. Nuhu Abdullahi Achika (APC) (Wudil Constituency)
 Hon. Garba Ya'u Gwarmai (APC) (Kunchi/Tsanyawa Constituency)
 Hon. Abdullahi Iliyasu Yaryasa (APC) (Tudun Wada Constituency)
 Hon. Hamza S. Bichi (PDP) (Bichi Constituency)
 Hon. Abubakar U. Galadima (APC) (Bebeji Constituency)
 Hon. Ali Ibrahim Isah Shanono (APC) (Bagwai/Shanono Constituency)
 Hon. Muhammad Uba Gurjiya (APC) (Bunkure Constituency)
 Hon. Salisu Ibrahim Muhammad (APC) (Doguwa Constituency)
 Hon. Hafizu Sani Maifada (APC) (Dambatta Constituency)
 Hon. Rabi'u Saleh Gwarzo (PDP) (Gwarzo Constituency)
 Hon. Maifada Bello Kibiya (APC) (Kibiya Constituency)

References

Kano State
State legislatures of Nigeria
State lower houses in Nigeria